Vamanapuram River is an  long river in southern Kerala that flows through the northern parts of Thiruvananthapuram district. It is also the longest river in Thiruvananthapuram district. The river is also known as "Kollampuzhayaru" and "Attingalaru".The two tributaries of this river are the Upper Chittar & Manjaprayaar streams which originates near Ponmudi hill station.

Course 
The river originates in the Chemunjimotta hills (alt. 1860m) hills on the southern side of the Western Ghats, and flows entirely through Thiruvananthapuram district of Kerala. It course ends in Anjengo Lake (Anchuthengu Lake) near Chirayinkeezhu. The river flows along Attingal municipality, Karette, Palode, Vithura and Kallar.  Thiru Aaraattu Kavu Devi Temple, Kollampuzha that is connected with Travancore royal family is situated on the banks of this river.

The Meenmutty Falls is situated in the upper course of this river.

Significance 
The river is a major source of water for Municipalities of Attingal and Varkala. There is boating available in the lower course of river near Chirayinkeezhu. There is considerable tourism activities in the upper course of river especially at Meenmutty Falls and Thavakkal waterfalls.

Vamanapuram Irrigation Project 
It was envisaged in 1970's but couldn't materialize due to opposition from people. It is the only river in the district without a dam and there are currently plans to build a regulator in the river by Kerala Water Authority.

References

Rivers of Thiruvananthapuram district